Arturo Coste (born 15 June 1927, date of death unknown) was a Mexican water polo player. He competed in the men's tournament at the 1952 Summer Olympics.

References

External links
 

1927 births
Year of death missing
Mexican male water polo players
Olympic water polo players of Mexico
Water polo players at the 1952 Summer Olympics
Place of birth missing